The 2018–2020 AVC Beach Volleyball Continental Cup was a beach volleyball double-gender event for teams representing Asian countries. The winners of the event qualified for the 2020 Summer Olympics.

Men

Preliminary round

Central Asia
Host: Visakhapatnam, India

  advanced to the final round.
  advanced to the semifinal round.

Eastern Asia
Host: Zhongwei, China

  advanced to the final round.
  advanced to the semifinal round.

Oceania
Host: Tauranga, New Zealand

  advanced to the final round.
  advanced to the semifinal round.

Southeastern Asia

  (as the hosts) and  advanced to the final round.
  advanced to the semifinal round.

Western Asia
Host: Tripoli, Lebanon

  (as the defending champions) and  advanced to the final round.
  advanced to the semifinal round.

Semifinal round
Host: Nakhon Pathom, Thailand

  advanced to the final round.

Final round
Host: Nakhon Pathom, Thailand

Women

Preliminary round

Central Asia
Host: Visakhapatnam, India

  advanced to the final round.
  advanced to the semifinal round.

Eastern Asia
Host: Zhongwei, China

  advanced to the final round.
  advanced to the semifinal round.

Oceania
Host: Tauranga, New Zealand

  (as the defending champions) and  advanced to the final round.
  advanced to the semifinal round.

Southeastern Asia

  (as the hosts) and  advanced to the final round.
  advanced to the semifinal round.

Semifinal round
Host: Nakhon Pathom, Thailand

  and  advanced to the final round.

Final round
Host: Nakhon Pathom, Thailand

References

External links
Official website

Continental Beach Volleyball Cup
2019 in beach volleyball
2020 in beach volleyball
2021 in beach volleyball